Sainte-Jamme-sur-Sarthe (literally Sainte-Jamme on Sarthe) is a commune in the Sarthe department in the region of Pays de la Loire in north-western France.

The area was host to a knighting tournament attended by William Marshal, 1st Earl Pembroke, in 1166.

See also
Communes of the Sarthe department

References

Communes of Sarthe